A body of water or waterbody (often spelled water body) is any significant accumulation of water on the surface of Earth or another planet. The term most often refers to oceans, seas, and lakes, but it includes smaller pools of water such as ponds, wetlands, or more rarely, puddles. A body of water does not have to be still or contained; rivers, streams, canals, and other geographical features where water moves from one place to another are also considered bodies of water.

Most are naturally occurring geographical features, but some are artificial. There are types that can be either. For example, most reservoirs are created by engineering dams, but some natural lakes are used as reservoirs. Similarly, most harbors are naturally occurring bays, but some harbors have been created through construction.

Bodies of water that are navigable are known as waterways. Some bodies of water collect and move water, such as rivers and streams, and others primarily hold water, such as lakes and oceans.

Bodies of water are affected by gravity, which is what creates the tidal effects on Earth. Moreso, the impact of climate change on water is likely to intensify as observed through the rising sea levels, water acidification and flooding. This means that climate change has pressure on water bodies.

Types 

Bodies of water can be categorized into:

 Rain water
 Surface water
 Underground water

Note that there are some geographical features involving water that are not bodies of water, for example, waterfalls, geysers and rapids.

Arm of the sea – also sea arm, used to describe a sea loch.
Arroyo – (southwest US) (seasonal) a usually-dry bed of a steep-sided stream, gully, or narrow channel that temporarily fills with water after heavy rain. See also wadi.
Artificial lake or artificial pond – see reservoir (impoundment).
Aubach
Barachois – (Canada) a lagoon separated from the ocean by a sand bar.
Basin
Bay – an area of water bordered by land on three sides, similar to, but smaller than a gulf.
Bayou – (southern US) a slow-moving stream or a marshy lake.
Beck – (UK) a small stream (esp. with a rocky bottom); creek.
Bight – a large and often only slightly receding bay, or a bend in any geographical feature.
Billabong – an oxbow lake in Australia; a pond or still body of water created when a river changes course and some water becomes trapped.
Boil – see seep
Bog – a type of wetland that accumulates peat due to incomplete decomposition of plant matter.
Bourn – a brook; stream; small, seasonal stream.
Brook – a small stream; a creek.
Brooklet – a small brook.
Burn – (Scottish) a small stream; a brook.
Canal – an artificial waterway, usually connected to (and sometimes connecting) existing lakes, rivers, or oceans.
Channel – the physical confine of a river, slough or ocean strait consisting of a bed and banks. See also stream bed and strait.
Cove – a coastal landform. Earth scientists generally use the term to describe a circular or round inlet with a narrow entrance, though colloquially the term is sometimes used to describe any sheltered bay.
Creek – (Australia, Canada, New Zealand, United States) a (narrow) stream that is smaller than a river; a minor tributary of a river; brook.
Creek (tidal) – (mainly British) an inlet of the sea, narrower than a cove.
Delta – the location where a river flows into an ocean, sea, estuary, lake, or reservoir.
Distributary or distributary channel – a stream that branches off and flows away from the main stream channel.
Drainage basin – a region of land where water from rain or snowmelt drains downhill into another body of water, such as a river, lake, or reservoir.
Draw – a usually dry creek bed or gulch that temporarily fills with water after a heavy rain, or seasonally. See also wadi.
Estuary – a semi-enclosed coastal body of water with one or more rivers or streams flowing into it, and with a free connection to the open sea
Firth – (Scottish) various coastal waters, such as large sea bays, estuaries, inlets, and straits.
Fjord (fiord) – a narrow inlet of the sea between cliffs or steep slopes.
Gill – (UK) a narrow stream or rivulet; brook; narrow mountain stream.
Glacier – a large collection of ice or a frozen river that moves slowly down a mountain.
 Glacial pothole – a giant's kettle.
Gulf – a part of a lake or ocean that extends so that it is surrounded by land on three sides, similar to, but larger than a bay.
Harbor – an artificial or naturally occurring body of water where ships are stored or may shelter from the ocean's weather and currents.
Hot spring – a spring produced by the emergence of geothermally heated groundwater.
Impoundment – an artificially-created body of water, by damming a source. Often used for flood control, as a drinking water supply (reservoir), recreation, ornamentation (artificial pond), or other purpose or combination of purposes. Note that the process of creating an "impoundment" of water is itself called "impoundment."
Inlet – a body of water, usually seawater, which has characteristics of one or more of the following: bay, cove, estuary, firth, fjord, geo, sea loch, or sound.
Kettle (or kettle lake) – a shallow, sediment-filled body of water formed by retreating glaciers or draining floodwaters.
Kill – used in areas of Dutch influence in New York, New Jersey and other areas of the former New Netherland colony of Dutch America to describe a strait, river, or arm of the sea.
Lagoon – a body of comparatively shallow salt or brackish water separated from the deeper sea by a shallow or exposed sandbank, coral reef, or similar feature.
Lake – a body of water, usually freshwater, of relatively large size contained on a body of land.
Lick — a small watercourse or an ephemeral stream
Loch – (Scottish) a body of water such as a lake, sea inlet, firth, fjord, estuary or bay.
Mangrove swamp – a saline coastal habitat of mangrove trees and shrubs.
Marsh – a wetland featuring grasses, rushes, reeds, typhas, sedges, and other herbaceous plants (possibly with low-growing woody plants) in a context of shallow water. See also salt marsh.
Mediterranean sea (oceanography) – a mostly enclosed sea that has a limited exchange of deep water with outer oceans and where the water circulation is dominated by salinity and temperature differences rather than winds
Mere – a lake or body of water that is broad in relation to its depth.
Mill pond – a reservoir built to provide flowing water to a watermill.
Moat – a deep, broad trench, either dry or filled with water, surrounding and protecting a structure, installation, or town.
Mud puddle
Ocean – a major body of salty water that, in totality, covers about 71% of the Earth's surface.
Oxbow lake – a U-shaped lake formed when a wide meander from the mainstem of a river is cut off to create a lake.
Phytotelma – a small, discrete body of water held by some plants.
Plunge pool – a depression at the base of a waterfall.
Pool – various small bodies of water such as a swimming pool, reflecting pool, pond, or puddle.
Pond – a body of water smaller than a lake, especially those of artificial origin.
Port – a maritime facility where ships may dock to load and discharge passengers and cargo.
Pothole – see kettle
Puddle – a small accumulation of water on a surface, usually the ground.
Reflecting pool – a water feature usually consisting of a shallow pool of water, undisturbed by fountain jets, for a reflective surface.
Reservoir – a place to store water for various uses, especially drinking water, which can be a natural or artificial (see lake and impoundment).
Rill – a shallow channel of running water. These can be either natural or man-made. Also: a very small brook; rivulet; small stream.
River – a natural waterway usually formed by water derived from either precipitation or glacial meltwater, and flows from higher ground to lower ground.
Rivulet – (UK, US literary) a small or very small stream.
Roadstead – a place outside a harbor where a ship can lie at anchor; it is an enclosed area with an opening to the sea, narrower than a bay or gulf (often called a "roads").
Run – a small stream or part thereof, especially a smoothly flowing part of a stream.
Salt marsh – a type of marsh that is a transitional zone between land and an area, such as a slough, bay, or estuary, with salty or brackish water.
Sea – a large expanse of saline water connected with an ocean, or a large, usually saline, lake that lacks a natural outlet such as the Caspian Sea and the Dead Sea. In common usage, often synonymous with the ocean.
Sea loch – a sea inlet loch.
Sea lough – a fjord, estuary, bay or sea inlet.
Seep – a body of water formed by a spring.
Slough – several different meanings related to wetland or aquatic features.
Source – the original point from which the river or stream flows. A river's source is sometimes a spring.
Shoal – a natural submerged ridge, bank, or bar that consists of, or is covered by, sand or other unconsolidated material, and rises from the bed of a body of water to near the surface.
Sound – a large sea or ocean inlet larger than a bay, deeper than a bight, wider than a fjord, or it may identify a narrow sea or ocean channel between two bodies of land.
Spring – a point where groundwater flows out of the ground, and is thus where the aquifer surface meets the ground surface
Strait – a narrow channel of water that connects two larger bodies of water, and thus lies between two land masses.
Stream – a body of water with a detectable current, confined within a bed and banks.
Stream pool – a stretch of a river or stream in which the water is relatively deep and slow moving.
Streamlet — a small stream; rivulet.
Subglacial lake – a lake that is permanently covered by ice and whose water remains liquid by the pressure of the ice sheet and geothermal heating. They often occur under glaciers or ice caps. Lake Vostok in Antarctica is an example.
Swamp – a wetland that features permanent inundation of large areas of land by shallow bodies of water, generally with a substantial number of hummocks, or dry-land protrusions.
Swimming pool – an artificial container filled with water intended for swimming.
Tank – (or stock tank, Texas) an artificial pond, usually for watering cattle or other livestock.
Tarn – a mountain lake or pool formed in a cirque excavated by a glacier.
Tide pool – a rocky pool adjacent to an ocean and filled with seawater.
Tributary or affluent – a stream or river that flows into the main stem (or parent) river or a lake.
Vernal pool – a shallow, natural depression in level ground, with no permanent above-ground outlet, that holds water seasonally.
Wadi – a usually-dry creek bed or gulch that temporarily fills with water after a heavy rain, or seasonally; located in North Africa and Western Asia. See also arroyo (creek).
Wash – a usually dry creek bed or gulch that temporarily fills with water after a heavy rain, or seasonally. See also wadi.
Wetland – an environment "at the interface between truly terrestrial ecosystems and truly aquatic systems making them different from each yet highly dependent on both".

See also

 
 
 
 
 
 
 
 Glossary of landforms

References

Sources 
 Mitsch, W.J. and J.G. Gosselink. 2007. Wetlands, 4th ed., John Wiley & Sons, Inc., New York, 582 pp.

Citations

External links 

 Types of Water Bodies (archived 12 November 2011)